GHS Strings is an American string manufacturer based Battle Creek, Michigan, specializing in electric and acoustic guitar and bass guitar strings. The company was founded on August 1, 1964, and in 1975 was bought by Robert McFee, who is the Chairman of the Board with son, Russell McFee, as President. The name GHS comes from the surnames of the company's founders — Gould, Holcomb and Solko.

In 2000, the GHS acquired guitar electronics company Rocktron, diversifying into new types of guitar equipment.

Users 

GHS strings are used by many musicians of varying styles, but several notable artists include:
Jack White of The White Stripes
Dusty Hill of ZZ Top
Carlos Santana
Tom Morello formerly of Audioslave and Rage Against the Machine
Eddie Vedder of Pearl Jam
Stevie Ray Vaughan
David Gilmour of Pink Floyd
Flea of Red Hot Chili Peppers
Dan Donegan of Disturbed
Quorthon of Bathory
Willie Adler and Mark Morton of Lamb of God
Stone Gossard of Pearl Jam
Justin Hayward and John Lodge of The Moody Blues
Tommy Shaw of Styx
Neal Schon of Journey
Mark Stoermer of The Killers
Matchbox 20
Ted Nugent
Foo Fighters
Lynyrd Skynyrd
Def Leppard
Steve Howe of Yes
Hank Williams Jr.
Evan Hirschelman
Rusty Cooley of Outworld
Martin Barre of Jethro Tull
Stuart Hamm of Joe Satriani
Goo Goo Dolls
John Mellencamp
Diamond Rio
The Oak Ridge Boys
Colin Raye
Seventh Day Slumber
Steven Springer
Third Eye Blind
Travis Tritt
Pam Tillis
No Doubt
Gary Hoey
Rancid
Gene Simmons of Kiss
James Mercer of The Shins
Skillet
Ola Englund of Feared and The Haunted
Randy Rhoads of Ozzy Osbourne and Quiet Riot
Damon Fowler
Dany Franchi
Michael Wilton of Queensrÿche
Chris DeGarmo (formerly of Queensrÿche)

References 

Credits of the 1988 vinyl and CD editions of Queensrÿche's Operation: Mindcrime album. Retrieved 2021-08-26.

External links 
Official website

American musical instrument makers
Manufacturing companies established in 1964